Jeffrey Jennings (born November 6, 1987) is an American soccer player.

Career
Jennings spent four years at Fort Lewis College and also played for El Paso Patriots and Real Colorado Foxes in the USL Premier Development League before signing with San Antonio Scorpions in 2012.  His professional debut didn't come until April 28, 2013, he got the start against FC Edmonton in a match that ended in a 1-0 defeat.

References

External links
Fort Lewis College bio

1987 births
Living people
American soccer players
Fort Lewis Skyhawks men's soccer players
El Paso Patriots players
Real Colorado Foxes players
San Antonio Scorpions players
Association football midfielders
Soccer players from Colorado
USL League Two players
North American Soccer League players